Muratore is a surname. Notable people with the surname include:

John Muratore, American engineer
Lucien Muratore (1876–1954), French actor and opera singer
Matt Muratore, American politician
Simone Muratore (born 1998), Italian footballer
Victoria Muratore (born 1994), Brazilian water polo player